Jean Nako Naprapol (born 20 July 1980 in Tanna) is an international footballer for Vanuatu. He played in the 2008 and 2012 OFC Nations Cup.

International goals

References

External links
 

1980 births
Living people
Vanuatuan footballers
Vanuatu international footballers
2008 OFC Nations Cup players
2012 OFC Nations Cup players
Association footballers not categorized by position